English names are names used in, or originating in, England.
In England as elsewhere in the English-speaking world, a complete name usually consists of a given name, commonly referred to as a first name, and a (most commonly patrilineal, rarely matrilineal) family name or surname, also referred to as a last name. There can be several given names, some of these being often referred to as a second name, or middle name(s).

Given names
Most given names used in England do not have English derivation. Most traditional names are Hebrew (Daniel, David, Elizabeth, Susan), Greek (Nicholas, Dorothy, George, Helen), Germanic names adopted via the transmission of Old French/Norman (Robert, Richard, Gertrude, Charlotte), or Latin (Adrian, Amelia, Patrick).

There remains a limited set of given names which have an actual English derivation (see Anglo-Saxon names); examples include Alfred, Ashley, Edgar, Edmund, Edward, Edwin, Harold and Oswald. A distinctive feature of Anglophone names is the surnames of important families used as given names, originally to indicate political support or patronage. Many examples have now become normal names chosen because parents like them, and any political sense lost. Most are male names like Cecil, Gerald, Howard, Percy, Montague, Stanley or Gordon, though some have female versions like Cecilia or Geraldine. Other languages have few equivalents, although the saint's surname Xavier is often used by Roman Catholics.

During most of the 19th century, the most popular given names were Mary and either John or William for girls and boys, respectively. Throughout the Early Modern period, the variation of given names was comparatively small; the three most frequent male given names accounted for close to 50% of male population throughout this period. For example, of the boys born in London in the year 1510, 24.4% were named John, 13.3% were named Thomas and 11.7% were named William. A trend towards more diversity in given names began in the mid-19th century, and by 1900, 22.9% of the newborn boys, and 16.2% of the newborn girls in the UK shared the top three given names. The trend continued during the 20th century, and by 1994, these figures had fallen to 11% and 8.6%, respectively. This trend is a result of a combination of greater individualism in the choice of names, and the increasing ethnic heterogeneity of UK population, which led to a wider range of frequent given names from non-European traditions. Oliver and Olivia were the most popular baby names in England and Wales in 2018.

Translations

Surnames
According to Christopher Daniell, in From Norman Conquest to Magna Carta, 1140 marked what might be the first recorded use of a modern surname, inherited by multiple generations.  The sons of a Norman named Robert used a modern inheritable surname, FitzGerald, in honour of an earlier relative, named Gerald. 

The introduction of parish registers in 1538 contributed significantly to the stabilization of the surname system, but it was not until the late 17th century that fixed surnames were introduced throughout England.

According to the Office for National Statistics, the top ten most frequent surnames in England during the 1990s were:
Smith
Jones
Williams
Brown
Taylor
Davies
Evans
Wilson
Thomas
Johnson

While it is normal for a child to be given one of their parents' surnames, traditionally the father's (or increasingly some combination of the two), there is nothing in UK law that explicitly requires this. Under English common law, a person may use any name as a legal name, though most people use their birth name (as registered on the Register of Births, Marriages and Deaths, regulated by the Registration of Births and Deaths Regulations 1987, which allows only characters that are used in English or Welsh), often using a spouse's surname (proved with a marriage certificate), or (if an adult) a name formally declared by deed poll. No regulations include any specific provisions regarding what names are acceptable. Nonetheless, the General Register Office and various organizations that help with creating and enrolling deed polls will reject anything that is unreasonable (racist, offensive, fraudulent, implying a title of nobility not held, unpronounceable, not in the Latin script, etc.).

Compound surnames

Double-barrelled names may be formed for a variety of reasons, including combining of spouses' surnames upon marriage or, more commonly in the past, adding another family's surname as a condition of inheritance.

Compound surnames in English feature two words, often joined by a hyphen or hyphens, For example Henry Hepburne-Scott, with some families having as many as four words making up their surname, such as Charles Hepburn-Stuart-Forbes-Trefusis, 21st Baron Clinton and Alexander Charles Robert Vane-Tempest-Stewart, 9th Marquess of Londonderry.  However, it is not unusual for compound surnames to be composed of separate words not linked by a hyphen, for example Iain Duncan Smith, a former leader of the Conservative Party, whose surname is "Duncan Smith".

See also
List of the most common surnames in Europe

References

External links
English Surnames (about.com)
Given Names in England Before 1800
Seven Types of English Surnames
Baby names in England and Wales: 2018 Most popular first names for baby boys and girls in 2018 using birth registration data (Office of National Statistics)

Names by culture